In Buddhism,  is a Pali word (Sanskrit: karmasthana) which literally means place of work. Its original meaning was someone's occupation (farming, trading, cattle-tending, etc.) but this meaning has developed into several distinct but related usages all having to do with Buddhist meditation.

Etymology and meanings 

Its most basic meaning is as a word for meditation, with meditation being the main occupation of Buddhist monks. In Burma, senior meditation practitioners are known as "kammatthanacariyas" (meditation masters). The Thai Forest Tradition names itself Kammaṭṭhāna Forest tradition in reference to their practice of meditating in the forests.

In the Pali literature, prior to the post-canonical Pali commentaries, the term  comes up in only a handful of discourses and then in the context of "work" or "trade."

Buddhaghosa uses "kammatthana" to refer to each of his forty meditation objects listed in the third chapter of the Visuddhimagga, which are partially derived from the Pāli Canon. In this sense "kammatthana" can be understood as "occupations" in the sense of "things to occupy the mind" or "workplaces" in the sense of "places to focus the mind on during the work of meditation". Throughout his translation of the Visuddhimagga, Nanamoli translates this term simply as "meditation subject".

Buddhaghosa's forty meditation subjects

Kasiṇas as kammaṭṭhāna
Kasiṇa (Pali: कसिण kasiṇa; Sanskrit: कृत्स्न kṛtsna; literally, a "whole") refers to a class of basic visual objects of meditation used in Theravada Buddhism. The objects are described in the Pali Canon and summarized in the famous Visuddhimagga meditation treatise as kammaṭṭhāna on which to focus the mind whenever attention drifts. Kasiṇa meditation is one of the most common types of samatha meditation, intended to settle the mind of the practitioner and create a foundation for further practices of meditation.

The Visuddhimagga concerns kasina-meditation. According to American scholar monk Thanissaro Bhikkhu, "the text then tries to fit all other meditation methods into the mold of kasina practice, so that they too give rise to countersigns, but even by its own admission, breath meditation does not fit well into the mold." He argues that by emphasizing kasina-meditation, the Visuddhimagga departs from the focus on dhyana in the Pali Canon. Thanissaro Bhikkhu states this indicates that what "jhana means in the commentaries is something quite different from what it means in the Canon."

Although practice with kasiṇas is associated with the Theravāda tradition, it appears to have been more widely known among various Buddhist schools in India at one time. Asanga makes reference to kasiṇas in the Samāhitabhūmi section of his Yogācārabhūmi. Uppalavanna, one of the Buddha's chief female disciples, famously attained arahantship using a fire (tejo) kasina as her object of meditation.

Of the forty objects meditated upon as kammatthana, the first ten are kasiṇa described as 'things one can behold directly'. These are described in the Visuddhimagga, and also mentioned in the Pali Tipitaka.
They are:
 earth (Pali: paṭhavī kasiṇa, Sanskrit: pṛthivī kṛtsna)
 water (āpo kasiṇa, ap kṛtsna)
 fire (tejo kasiṇa, tejas kṛtsna)
 air/wind (vāyo kasiṇa, vāyu kṛtsna)
 blue (nīla kasiṇa, nīla kṛtsna)
 yellow ; pīta kasiṇa, pīta kṛtsna)
 red (lohita kasiṇa, lohita kṛtsna)
 white (odāta kasiṇa, avadāta kṛtsna)
 enclosed space, hole, aperture (ākāsa kasiṇa, ākāśa kṛtsna)
 consciousness (viññāṇa kasiṇa, vijñāna kṛtsna) in the Pali suttas and some other texts; the bright light (of the luminous mind) (āloka kasiṇa) according to later sources such as Buddhaghosa's Visuddhimagga.

The kasiṇas are typically described as a colored disk, with the particular color, properties, dimensions and medium often specified according to the type of kasiṇa. The earth kasiṇa, for instance, is a disk in a red-brown color formed by spreading earth or clay (or another medium producing similar color and texture) on a screen of canvas or another backing material.

Paṭikkūla-manasikāra 

The next ten are impure (asubha) objects of repulsion (paṭikkūla), specifically 'cemetery contemplations' (sīvathikā-manasikāra) on ten stages of human decomposition which aim to cultivate mindfulness of body (kāyagatāsati).
They are:
 a swollen corpse
 a discolored, bluish, corpse
 a festering corpse
 a fissured corpse
 a gnawed corpse
 a dismembered corpse
 a hacked and scattered corpse
 a bleeding corpse
 a worm-eaten corpse
 a skeleton

Anussati 

The next ten are recollections (anussati):
 First three recollections are of the virtues of the Three Jewels:
 Buddha
 Dharma
 Sangha
 Next three are recollections of the virtues of:
 morality (śīla)
 liberality (cāga)
 the wholesome attributes of Devas
 The additional four recollections of:
 the body (kāya)
 death (see  Upajjhatthana Sutta)
 the breath (prāna) or breathing (ānāpāna)
 peace (see Nibbana)

Brahma-vihārā 

Four are 'stations of Brahma', which are the virtues of the "Brahma realm" (Pāli: Brahmaloka): 
 unconditional kindness and goodwill (mettā)
 compassion (karuna)
 sympathetic joy over another's success (mudita)
 evenmindedness, equanimity (upekkha)

Āyatana
Four are formless states (four arūpa-āyatana):
 infinite space (Pāḷi ākāsānañcāyatana, Skt. ākāśānantyāyatana)
 infinite consciousness (Pāḷi viññāṇañcāyatana, Skt. vijñānānantyāyatana)
 infinite nothingness (Pāḷi ākiñcaññāyatana, Skt. ākiṃcanyāyatana)
 neither perception nor non-perception (Pāḷi nevasaññānāsaññāyatana, Skt. naivasaṃjñānāsaṃjñāyatana)

Others
Of the remaining five, one is of perception of disgust of food (aharepatikulasanna) and the last four are the 'four great elements' (catudhatuvavatthana): earth (pathavi), water (apo), fire (tejo), air (vayo).

Meditation subjects and the four jhānas 

According to Gunaratana, following Buddhaghosa, due to the simplicity of subject matter, all four jhanas can be induced through ānāpānasati (mindfulness of breathing) and the ten kasinas.

According to Gunaratana, the following meditation subjects only lead to "access concentration" (upacara samadhi), due to their complexity: the recollection of the Buddha, dharma, sangha, morality, liberality, wholesome attributes of Devas, death, and peace; the perception of disgust of food; and the analysis of the four elements.

Absorption in the first jhana can be realized by mindfulness on the ten kinds of foulness and mindfulness of the body. However, these meditations cannot go beyond the first jhana due to their involving applied thought (vitaka), which is absent from the higher jhanas.

Absorption in the first three jhanas can be realized by contemplating the first three brahma-viharas. However, these meditations cannot aid in attaining the fourth jhana due to the pleasant feelings associated with them. Conversely, once the fourth jhana is induced, the fourth brahma-vihara (equanimity) arises.

Meditation subjects and temperaments 
Each kammatthana can be suggested, especially by a spiritual friend , to a certain individual student at some specific point, by assessing what would be best for that student's temperament and the present state of his or her mind.

All of the aforementioned meditation subjects can suppress the Five Hindrances, thus allowing one to fruitfully pursue wisdom.  In addition, anyone can productively apply specific meditation subjects as antidotes, such as meditating on foulness to counteract lust or on the breath to abandon discursive thought.

The Pali commentaries further provide guidelines for suggesting meditation subjects based on one's general temperament:
 Greedy: the ten foulness meditations; or, body contemplation.
 Hating: the four brahma-viharas; or, the four color kasinas.
 Deluded: mindfulness of breath.
 Faithful: the first six recollections.
 Intelligent: recollection of marana or Nibbana; the perception of disgust of food; or, the analysis of the four elements.
 Speculative: mindfulness of breath.

The six non-color kasinas and the four formless states are suitable for all temperaments.

Supernormal abilities
The Visuddhimagga is one of the extremely rare texts within the enormous literature of Buddhism to give explicit details about how spiritual masters are thought to actually manifest supernormal abilities. Abilities such as flying through the air, walking through solid obstructions, diving into the ground, walking on water and so forth are performed by changing one element, such as earth, into another element, such as air. The individual must master kasina meditation before this is possible. Dipa Ma, who trained via the Visuddhimagga, was said to demonstrate these abilities.

See also 
 Anussati
 Upajjhatthana Sutta (Five Remembrances)
 Ānāpānasati Sutta (Contemplation of the breath)
 Kāyagatāsati Sutta (Contemplation of the body)
 Patikkulamanasikara
 Gradual training (Patipatti)
 Buddhist meditation
 Jhana in Theravada
 Anapanasati
 Samatha
 Vipassanā

Notes

References

Further reading 

 Buddhaghosa, Bhadantacariya & Bhikkhu Nanamoli (trans.) (1999), The Path of Purification: Visuddhimagga. Seattle: BPS Pariyatti Editions. .
 Gunaratana, Henepola (1988). The Jhanas in Theravada Buddhist Meditation (Wheel No. 351/353). Kandy, Sri Lanka: Buddhist Publication Society. . Retrieved from "Access to Insight" at http://www.accesstoinsight.org/lib/authors/gunaratana/wheel351.html.
 , Bhikkhu (trans.) & Bodhi, Bhikkhu (ed.) (2001). The Middle-Length Discourses of the Buddha: A Translation of the Majjhima Nikāya. Boston: Wisdom Publications. .
 Thanissaro Bhikkhu (trans.) (1995), Dighajanu (Vyagghapajja) Sutta: To Dighajanu (AN 8.54). Retrieved 6 Apr. 2010 from "Access to Insight" at http://www.accesstoinsight.org/tipitaka/an/an08/an08.054.than.html.
 Thanissaro Bhikkhu (trans.) (2000), Sakka Sutta: To the Sakyans (on the Uposatha)  (AN 10.46). Retrieved 6 Apr. 2010 from "Access to Insight" at http://www.accesstoinsight.org/tipitaka/an/an10/an10.046.than.html.

External links 
 In search of a teacher by Dr. Tin Htut
 Samatha and vipassana by Sayadaw U Uttamasara
 Reaching Nibbana through insight a guide by Ven. K. Nyanananda
The Forty Meditation Objects: Who Should Use Which? by Karen Andrews
Dharmathai Kammathana Blog Chinawangso Bhikkhu
"Colour-Kasiṇa Meditation," by Thitapu Bhikkhu, includes instructions for use and construction of the kasiṇa object. Via Archive.org.
"Kasiṇa: The use of a Visual Meditation Object" (2004), by Sotapanna Jhanananda (Jeffrey S. Brooks), describes the context for kasiṇa objects in the pursuit of Nibbana and discusses the color of an "earth" kasiṇa.
"Kasiṇa(2)," PTS Pali-English Dictionary entry, includes Tipitaka references and related terms.

Buddhist meditation
Buddhist philosophical concepts
Pali words and phrases